Sorø is a town in Sorø municipality in Region Sjælland on the island of Zealand (Sjælland) in east Denmark.  The population is 7,999 (2022).  The municipal council and the regional council are located in Sorø.

Sorø was founded in 1161 by Bishop Absalon, later the founder of Copenhagen, and is the site of Sorø Academy (Danish Sorø Akademis Skole).  The Academy is an educational institution built in 1140. Also built that year was Sorø Klosterkirke, the church where Bishop Absalon and Margaret I of Denmark were buried (she was later moved to Roskilde Domkirke, Roskilde).

Many people live in Sorø, but work either in the greater Copenhagen metropolitan area or in the town of Roskilde.

Economy
Companies headquartered in Sorø include Hørkram.

Notable people 

 Absalon (ca.1128–1201) a statesman and prelate of the Catholic Church, bishop of Roskilde, 1158 to 1192 and archbishop of Lund, 1178 to 1201.
 Caspar Bartholin the Elder (1585–1629 in Sorø) a physician, scientist and theologian.
 Ludvig Holberg, Baron of Holberg (1684–1754) writer, essayist, philosopher, historian and playwright; buried in Sorø.
 Otto Thott (1703–1785) a Count and landowner, lived and buried in Sorø
 Jens Schielderup Sneedorff (1724 in Sorø–1764) an author, professor of political science with a big role in the Age of Enlightenment
 Jens Paludan-Müller (1771 in Sorø–1845) a Danish bishop, teacher and author, Bishop of Aarhus 1830–1845 
 Christian Molbech (1783 in Sorø–1857) an historian and critic
 Bernhard Severin Ingemann (1789–1862 in Sorø) a novelist and poet.
 Louise Thomsen (1823 in Sorø–1907) a pioneering photographer
 Christian Frederik Lütken (1827 in Sorø–1901) zoologist and naturalist
 Julius Petersen (1839 in Sorø–1910) mathematician, on graph theory
 Emilie Mundt (1842 in Sorø–1922) painter of portraits of children
 Bernhard Bang (1848 in Sorø–1932) veterinarian, worked on bovine TB
 Margrete Heiberg Bose (1865 in Sorø–1952) an Argentine physicist
 Thorkel Møller (1868 in Sorø–1946) an architect, worked in Aarhus
 Astrid Holm (1893 in Sønder Bjerge Sogn – 1961) a Danish theater and film actress from the early silent film era
 Lulu Ziegler (1903–1973), actress, singer and theatre director
 Yvonne Herløv Andersen (born 1942) a Danish politician, elected to the Folketing in 1977,  serving variously for Sorø until 2001
 Ina Skriver (born 1945 in Sorø) retired actress and model, worked mostly in British films and TV, now lives in Withypool, Somerset
 Peter Reinhard Hansen (born 1968 in Sorø) Professor of Economics at the University of North Carolina
 Martin Høgsted (born 1982 in Dianalund) a Danish stand-up comedian

Sport 
 Axel Thayssen (1885 in Sorø–1952) a Danish tennis player, competed in the 1912 Summer Olympics
 Bent Jensen (born 1925 in Sorø) a Danish rower, competed at the 1952 Summer Olympics
 Trine Hansen (born 1973) a retired female rower, bronze medallist at the 1996 Summer Olympics, grew up in Sorø

See also
 Sorø Museum
 Sorø Academy

References

External links

 Sorø municipality's official website
 Tourist information

Municipal seats of Region Zealand
Cities and towns in Region Zealand
Sorø Municipality